Sanja Mandić (Serbian Cyrillic: Сања Мандић; born 14 March 1995) is a Serbian basketball player for BC Samara and the Serbian national team, where she participated at the 2014 FIBA World Championship and EuroBasket Women 2017.

Honours
Radivoj Korać 
 National Championship of Serbia (3): 2013–14, 2014–15, 2015–16
 National Cup of Serbia (1): 2013-14
 Adriatic League Women (1): 2013-14

References

External links
Profile at eurobasket.com

1995 births
Living people
Basketball players from Belgrade
Point guards
Serbian expatriate basketball people in Hungary
Serbian women's basketball players
ŽKK Radivoj Korać players
ŽKK Crvena zvezda players